Ronald Chitiyo (born June 10, 1992), commonly known as Rooney, is a Zimbabwean footballer who plays as a midfielder for Zimbabwe Premier Soccer League side CAPS United and the Zimbabwe national team.

Career

Club
Chitiyo, son of former footballer Frank Chitiyo, began his senior career with Douglas Warriors F.C. Two years later, he left to join Monomotapa United, during his time with Monomotapa he finished as second runner-up in the 2012 Soccer Star of the Year award. In 2013, Chitiyo had trials at South African Premier Soccer League duo Ajax Cape Town and Orlando Pirates but failed to gain a contract. 12 months later he signed for Dynamos following Monomotapa's relegation from the top division. 2015 saw a failed move to South African side Royal Eagles which led Chitiyo to extend his stay with Dynamos.

Chitiyo would leave Dynamos around a year later, though, to sign for Harare City in 2015. In January 2017, Chitiyo joined reigning Zimbabwe Premier Soccer League champions CAPS United on a two-year deal. On 18 August, Chitiyo was on the move again as he left Zimbabwean football for the first time to join Tunisian Ligue Professionnelle 1 side CS Sfaxien on a four-year contract. He left Sfaxien to rejoin CAPS United in January 2018 following no appearances and contract disputes.

International
Chitiyo has won Fourteen caps for the Zimbabwe national team and has managed two goals for his nation. His two goals for Zimbabwe have come against Lesotho and Mauritius.

Career statistics

Club
.

International
.

International goals
. Scores and results list Zimbabwe's goal tally first.

Honours
Dynamos
 Zimbabwe Premier Soccer League: 2014

References

External links
 

1992 births
Living people
Zimbabwean footballers
Zimbabwe international footballers
Zimbabwean expatriate footballers
Expatriate footballers in Tunisia
Zimbabwean expatriate sportspeople in Tunisia
Association football midfielders
Monomotapa United F.C. players
Dynamos F.C. players
Harare City F.C. players
CAPS United players
CS Sfaxien players
Zimbabwe A' international footballers
2016 African Nations Championship players
2020 African Nations Championship players